Refugio ("Refuge") may refer to:

Places:
Refugio County, Texas
Refugio, Texas, a town in Refugio County
Refugio State Beach, near Santa Barbara, California
Refugio Canyon, a region near Santa Barbara, California
Refugio Creek, a river running along Refugio Valley from the hills of western Contra Costa County, California

Other:
Refugio, a 2003 album by Apocalypse
Rancho Nuestra Señora del Refugio, the Spanish land grant in what is today Santa Barbara County, California
Mission Nuestra Señora del Refugio near Refugio, Texas
Battle of Refugio, fought in 1836 near Refugio, Texas
Refugio railway station, a Guadalajara light rail station